Loser's Paradise is an album by country music singer-songwriter Chris Gaffney, released in 1995 on HighTone Records. It was Gaffney's second album released on HighTone, and was produced by Dave Alvin. It was recorded over a 10-day period in Austin, Texas.

Track listing
 "The Eyes of Roberto Duran"
 "Loser's Paradise"
 "The Man of Somebody's Dream"
 "So Far From God (And Too Close You)"
 "East of Houston, West of Baton Rouge"
 "Cowboys to Girls"
 "Azulito"
 "My Baby's Got a Dead Man's Number"
 "See The Big Man Cry"
 "Help You Dream"
 "Glasshouse"
 "Sugar Bee"

Personnel
Dave Alvin -	Acoustic and Electric Guitar, Producer
Ponty Bone -	Accordion
Sarah Brown -	Bass
Jackson Browne:	Composer
Ed Bruce: 	Composer
Gene Elders:	Fiddle
Rosie Flores:	Vocals
Chris Gaffney:	Accordion, Guitar, Piano, Vocals
Kenny Gamble:	Composer
Leon Huff:	Composer
Jim Lauderdale:	Vocals
Donald Lindley:	Drums, Percussion
Ian McLagan:	Hammond organ
Danny Ott:	Acoustic and Electric Guitar, Slide Guitar, Background vocals
Ted Roddy:	Harmonica
Tom Russell:	Composer
Eddie Shuler:	Composer
B.J. Swan:	Composer
James Tuttle:	Engineer
Tony Villanueva:	Vocals
Scott Walls:	Pedal Steel
Dale Watson:	Vocals
Bradley Jaye Williams:	Accordion
Lucinda Williams: 	Vocals

References

1995 albums
HighTone Records albums
Country albums by American artists